The Yemen Model was the rubric for the Obama Administration's attempts to neutralize foreign terrorist groups hostile to the United States.

Strategy

US President Barack Obama often cited the Yemen Model as his vision for dealing with insurgent groups.

Under the Yemen Model, the United States provided weapons, logistics, transportation and cash to a local proxy force, while committing no or few US troops. The United States also carried out air strikes and targeted killings of suspected opposition leaders.

Naming

The model was named after the conduct of the United States' continuing conflict in Yemen. The US wanted to minimize the ability of the Al-Qaeda in the Arabian Peninsula (AQAP) group to attack US territory, while at the same time, the Obama Administration wanted to commit as few resources to the fight as possible.

The United States picked a proxy force (in this case, tribes allied with government leader Abd Rabbuh Mansur Hadi), armed and trained them, and used them as a ground force against Al-Qaeda factions in exchange for US aid to the regime, totaling more than $600 million. The United States also conducted a significant low-tempo air and drone campaign starting in 2009. The US also occasionally launched commando raids inside Yemen and did base some military personnel in and around al-Annad air base in the south of the country.

The Obama Administration often defended its actions in Yemen as effective, and a model for other conflicts.

Other American conflicts
During the early stages of the current American conflict in Iraq, Obama cited the Yemen Model as the inspiration for the conduct of the war. He went so far as to mention Yemen as a model for success during his first speech about the new war in September 2014.

The Administration also defended its efforts in Somalia as an outgrowth of the strategy.

See also
 Obama Administration position on combat drones

References

Foreign policy of the Barack Obama administration
Obama administration initiatives
War on terror
Counterinsurgency